Layashty (Layaştı) is a rural locality (a selo) in Ishkarovsky Selsoviet, Ilishevsky District, Bashkortostan, Russia. The population was 460 as of 2010. There are 5 streets.

Geography 
Layashty is located 23 km east of Verkhneyarkeyevo (the district's administrative centre) by road. Ishkarovo is the nearest rural locality.

References 

Rural localities in Ilishevsky District